Bill Ryan may refer to:

 Bill Ryan (journalist) (1926–1997), American broadcast journalist
 Bill Ryan (footballer, born 1944), former Australian rules footballer
 Bill Ryan (footballer, born 1914) (1914–1966), Australian rules footballer
 Bill Ryan (professor) (born 1955), Canadian professor of social work
 Bill Ryan (rugby league) (1911–1975), Australian rugby league player

See also
 Billy Ryan (1887–1951), American football player
 William Ryan (disambiguation)